Crittenden may refer to:

Places in the United States
 Crittenden County, Arkansas
 Crittenden County, Kentucky
 Crittenden, Kentucky, a city
 Crittenden Township, Champaign County, Illinois
 Crittenden, Virginia, a community
 Crittenden Bridge, joining Suffolk and Isle of Wight County, Virginia 
 Crittenden Farm, a historic farm and ranch in Ashland County, Ohio
 Fort Crittenden, formerly Camp Crittenden, in Arizona
 The Crittenden, a high-rise apartment building in Cleveland, Ohio

Other uses
 Crittenden (surname)
 Crittenden Compromise, a failed compromise to preserve the Union right before the American Civil War
 Partridge v Crittenden, an English legal case of 1968 relevant to the law on offers for sale and invitations to treat
 Crittendens, a chain of grocery stores and liquor outlets in Melbourne, Australia, in the 20th century